Corinthia is a regional unit of Greece, situated around the city of Corinth.

Corinthia may also refer to:

Corinthia (ancient region), in ancient Greece
Corinthia (Conan), a nation in the fictional world of Conan the Barbarian
, a U.S. Navy patrol vessel 1917–1918
Corinthia Group of Companies
Corinthia Hotels International
Corinthia Hotel Budapest
Corinthia Hotel Khartoum
Corinthia Hotel London
Corinthia Hotel Prague
Corinthia Hotel St. Petersburg
Corinthia Hotel Tripoli

See also 

 Carinthia (disambiguation)